The following highways are numbered 963

United States